This is a list of flag bearers who have represented United States at the Olympics.  Flag bearers carry the national flag of their country at the opening ceremony and closing ceremony of the Olympic Games.  Men and women from across the country and from a variety of sports have carried the flag at both the Summer Olympic Games and the Winter Olympic Games.  More than half of those representing the teams at the Summer Olympics are track or field athletes, though that sport does account for the most competitors at the Games.

James Bickford, Norman Armitage, and Pat McDonald have all performed the duty twice.  Several athletes born in other countries have carried the flag, including those from Norway, Ireland, Sudan, Germany, and Czechoslovakia.

Firsts
US team manager Matthew Halpin was the first to carry the flag at the 1906 Intercalated Games, though that event is no longer considered by the International Olympic Committee to be part of Olympic history.  Ralph Rose became the first competitor to have the honor when he led the team out at the 1908 Summer Games, the first official Olympic Games to feature a parade of nations.  The first woman to represent the United States was fencer Janice Romary in 1968, her sixth consecutive Summer Olympics.  Taffy Abel was the first person to represent the United States at the Winter Olympics when he was chosen to carry the flag at the inaugural Games in Chamonix in 1924. Rafer Johnson became the first African American to serve as the nation's flag bearer at the 1960 Summer Olympics. Janice Romary became the first woman to carry the flag at the 1968 Summer Olympics. Irish-born Pat McDonald, one of the "Irish Whales", became the first athlete to be selected as the flag bearer twice when he performed his second duty in 1924.  In 1956 two other athletes led the U.S. team out for a second time, James Bickford at the Winter Olympics and Norman Armitage at the Summer Games.

Selection and reactions

The flag bearers are chosen by a vote of the team captains of each sport.

Athletes view their selection of flag bearer as a great honor:

Flag dipping

Olympic protocol is that the flag bearer dips their flag to the head of state as part of the parade.  It has become tradition that the U.S. flag is not dipped, though the origins of this are surrounded by legend and are widely misreported:

The parade of nations was introduced at the 1906 Intercalated Games with Matthew Halpin as the U.S. flag bearer.  Halpin gladly dipped the flag, noting that when he did so King George I of Greece "staked me to a smile that made me feel like I belonged".  The controversy began at the 1908 Summer Olympics in London where flag bearers were expected to dip the flag to Edward VII on two occasions.  Research by the International Society of Olympic Historians concluded that the flag bearer was Ralph Rose and that he might not have dipped the flag to the British King on one of those occasions in support of Irish struggle against British imperialism.  Martin Sheridan is often attributed with the explanation by stating at the time "This flag dips to no earthly king" but no evidence of this can be found.  Modern versions of the story describe how the Stars and Stripes have never been dipped during the parade of nations since 1908 but this is apocryphal.  It has been dipped on three occasions since then: 1912, 1924, and 1932.

The 1932 winter games were held in Lake Placid and, though head of state President Herbert Hoover would normally have greeted the parade of nations, the duty was passed to New York governor Franklin Roosevelt.  This was the last time that the flag was dipped at the Olympics as political forces intervened thereafter.  The head of state awaiting the athletes at the 1936 Summer Games was Adolf Hitler, to whom the U.S. refused to lower their flag.  The 1940 Olympics were cancelled due to the onset of World War II and, in 1942, the United States Congress introduced the United States Flag Code which stated: "That no disrespect should be given to the flag of the United States of America, the flag should not be dipped to any person or thing."  However, since the Flag Code is legally unenforceable, it appears to be merely codified tradition.

Foreign-born representatives

Several foreign-born athletes have represented the United States at the opening ceremonies.  Irishman Pat McDonald immigrated to the U.S. and was the first in 1920 and he, at the age of 42, became the oldest Olympic track & field champion.  Though he did not compete, he also went on to lead the U.S. team at the following Summer Olympics.

Rolf Monsen, a multi-discipline Winter sports athlete born in Oslo, Norway, immigrated to the U.S. and competed as an American in 1928 and 1932.  He qualified for the 1936 Games and though an injury prevented him from taking part, he was still chosen to carry the flag.

The American team at the 1936 Summer Games were led by Berlin-born, highly regarded gymnast Al Jochim who immigrated to the U.S.

Olga Fikotová was a discus-thrower at the 1956 Summer Olympics and the only athlete to win a gold medal for her home country Czechoslovakia in that year.  She began a much-publicised romance with American athlete Harold Connolly, much to the frustration of the Communist authorities.  Fikotová was accused of being a traitor and the Czechoslovak Olympic Committee banned her from representing her country again.  Now living in the U.S., she would go on to compete for her adopted country in the next four Summer Games.  Despite not being able to replicate her success, Fikotová was chosen to lead the American team at the 1972 Games in Munich, West Germany.

Lopez Lomong carried the flag at the 2008 Summer Olympics in Beijing, China and became the fifth flag bearer to be born outside the United States.  As a teenager in war-torn Sudan, Lomong was one of several thousand boys brought to America as a refugee in 2001.  His selection came during a time when the U.S. and other Western countries had been critical of the Chinese government's close links with Sudan, a country accused of human rights violations and war crimes.

Other notes
Godfrey Dewey, son of Melvil Dewey the inventor of Dewey Decimal Classification, was the president of the Lake Placid Organizing Committee and was largely responsible for the successful candidature of Lake Placid for the 1932 Winter Olympics.  In addition to his role as the U.S. ski team manager he was chosen as the flag bearer for the 1928 Games in St. Moritz, Switzerland.

List of flag bearers
List of flag bearers:
Key

See also
United States at the Olympics

Notes

References

Flag bearers
United States
Flag